Elise Mertens and Aryna Sabalenka defeated Barbora Krejčíková and Kateřina Siniaková in the final, 6–2, 6–3, to win the women's doubles tennis title at the 2021 Australian Open. It was their second major doubles title as a team, after the 2019 US Open. With the win, Sabalenka claimed the world No. 1 doubles ranking.

Tímea Babos and Kristina Mladenovic were the reigning champions, but withdrew from the tournament.

Seeds

Draw

Finals

Top half

Section 1

Section 2

Bottom half

Section 3

Section 4

Other entry information

Wild cards

Protected ranking

Withdrawals

See also 
2021 Australian Open – Day-by-day summaries

References

External links
Draw
 2021 Australian Open – Women's draws and results at the International Tennis Federation

Women's Doubles
Australian Open (tennis) by year – Women's doubles
Australian Open – Women's Doubles
Australian Open – Women's Doubles
Australian Open – Women's Doubles